Südzucker AG (literally South sugar) is a German company, the largest sugar producer in the world, with an annual production of around 4.8 million tonnes.

In February 2014, the Federal Cartel Office imposed a joint fine of 280 million euros on the company – together with its competitors Nordzucker and Pfeifer & Langen – for allegations of anticompetitive agreements.

Group segments

Sugar segment
The company has 30 sugar factories and three refineries in Austria, Belgium, Czech Republic, France, Germany, Hungary, Moldova, Poland, Romania, Slovakia, and Bosnia-Herzegovina.

Special Products segment
 BENEO-Palatinit GmbH, Mannheim
 Freiberger Lebensmittel GmbH & Co KG, Berlin
 PrimAS Tiefkühlprodukte GmbH, Oberhofen im Inntal, Austria
 Stateside Foods Ltd., Westhoughton, United Kingdom

CropEnergies segment

CropEnergies AG, Mannheim (bioethanol production)
operates 4 production sites in Germany (Zeitz), Belgium (Wanze), France (Loon-Plage), and the UK (Ensus Ltd in Wilton). The Zeitz plant is located adjacent to the beet sugar factory.

Fruit segment

Fruit preparations
Südzucker has 26 production sites in Argentina, Austria, Australia, Belgium, Brazil, China. Czech Republic, Fiji, France, Germany, Mexico, Morocco, Poland, Russia, Serbia, South Africa, South Korea, Turkey, Ukraine, and the United States.

Fruit juice concentrates

Südzucker has 10 production sites in Austria, China, Denmark, Hungary, Poland, Romania, and Ukraine.

See also
 Agrana

References

External links
 
 https://www.suedzucker.com
 

Sugar companies
Sugar industry in Germany
Food and drink companies of Germany
Agriculture companies of Germany
Companies based in Baden-Württemberg
Companies based in Mannheim
Food and drink companies established in 1926
1926 establishments in Germany
German brands